"Nandito Akó" (Tagalog for "I am here") is a song by Filipina singer Lea Salonga. It was released in July 1988, alongside Salonga's second studio album, Lea. 

The song was also recorded by Ogie Alcasid in 1989, Mexican diva Thalía in 1997, Jeffrey Hidalgo in 2000, Sharon Cuneta along with Alcasid in 2006, David Archuleta in 2012, Noel Cabangon in 2014, and Regine Velasquez-Alcasid and Pussycat Dolls lead singer Nicole Scherzinger in 2021.

Thalía version 

"Nandito Ako" was recorded by Mexican singer/actress Thalía, and released in early 1997. Thalia was very popular in the Philippines at the time after starring in the hit series Marimar, which was broadcast there in 1996. Like the original, the song is sung in Tagalog and was released as the lead single from her Philippine album, Nandito Ako.

Commercial performance 
Thalia's version subsequently became a huge hit in the Philippines, along with her previous album En éxtasis, and it sold over 40,000, after 10 months of its release.

In popular culture

Film 
A movie with the same title starring Kris Aquino and Phillip Salvador, directed by Jose "Kaka" Balagtas opened in theaters on 12 May 1994.

Television 
In 2011, David Archuleta recorded a version of the song for the Filipino mini series of the same name, Nandito Ako, where it served as the show's theme song.
 The programme was the second mini-serye by TV5, and like the first one, Sa Ngalan ng Ina (lit. In the Name of the Mother), it was also set to air for only a month. The song was later included on Archuleta's fourth studio album titled Forevermore, a covers album of Filipino songs.

References 

1988 songs
Philippine pop songs
Lea Salonga songs
1997 singles
Thalía songs
David Archuleta songs
Tagalog-language songs

pt:Nandito Ako (canção)